Dwayne Hollis (born July 7, 1989) is an American football defensive back for the Albany Empire of the National Arena League (NAL). He played college football at North Carolina Wesleyan College and attended Denbigh High School in Newport News, Virginia. He has also been a member of the Helsinki Roosters, Lehigh Valley Steelhawks, Trenton Freedom, Shanghai Skywalkers, and Atlanta Legends.

Early life
Hollis attended Denbigh High School.

College career
Hollis played for the North Carolina Wesleyan Battling Bishops from 2009 to 2012 and helped the Battling Bishops to 20 wins. As a sophomore, Hollis was named First Team All-USA South Athletic Conference as a Defensive Back. As a junior and senior, Hollis was named First Team All-USA South Athletic Conference as both a kick returner and as a defensive back. Hollis was also named an All-American at defensive back by the American Football Coaches Association.

Professional career

Helsinki Roosters
Hollis signed with the Helsinki Roosters of Vaahteraliiga in 2013.

Lehigh Valley Steelhawks
Hollis returned to the United States in 2014 when he signed with the Lehigh Valley Steelhawks of the Professional Indoor Football League. Hollis was named First Team All-League as both a defensive back and kick returner. Hollis was also named the PIFL's Special Teams Player of the Year. Hollis was the only defensive player in the PIFL to lead his team in all-purpose yardage.

Trenton Freedom
Hollis signed with the Trenton Freedom for 2015, but he placed on the other league exempt list before the season began.

Philadelphia Soul
On October 6, 2014, Hollis was assigned to the Philadelphia Soul. On October 9, 2015, Hollis had his rookie option exercised by the Soul. Hollis was named Second Team All-Arena following the 2016 season. Hollis helped lead the Soul to an ArenaBowl XXIX championship. Hollis was once again assigned to the Soul for the 2017 season. He earned AFL Defensive Back of the Year and First Team All-Arena honors in 2017. On August 26, 2017, the Soul beat the Tampa Bay Storm in ArenaBowl XXX by a score of 44–40.

Shanghai Skywalkers
Holllis was selected by the Shanghai Skywalkers in the third round of the 2016 CAFL Draft. He was named an All-Pro South Division All-Star. He is listed on the Skywalkers' roster for the 2018 season.

Atlanta Legends
In 2019, Hollis joined the Alliance of American Football's Atlanta Legends.

Philadelphia Soul (second stint)
Hollis was placed on the league suspension list as a member of the Philadelphia Soul on March 20, 2019, after he signed with the Legends of the AAF. After the AAF suspended football operations, he was activated from league suspension by the Soul on April 6, 2019.

Albany Empire
On November 26, 2021, Hollis signed with the Albany Empire of the National Arena League (NAL). On December 5, 2022, Hollis re-signed with the Empire.

References

External links
 North Carolina Wesleyan Battling Bishops bio

Living people
1989 births
Players of American football from Virginia
Sportspeople from Newport News, Virginia
American football defensive backs
North Carolina Wesleyan Battling Bishops football players
Lehigh Valley Steelhawks players
Trenton Freedom players
Philadelphia Soul players
Shanghai Skywalkers players
Atlanta Legends players
American expatriate sportspeople in Finland
American expatriate sportspeople in China
American expatriate players of American football